Kyrylo Tsypun (born 30 July 1987) is a Ukrainian futsal player who plays for Prodexim Kherson and the Ukraine national futsal team.

References

External links
UEFA profile

1987 births
Living people
Futsal goalkeepers
Ukrainian men's futsal players
Uragan Ivano-Frankivsk players
MFC Prodexim Kherson players